The 1977 North Texas State Mean Green football team represented North Texas State University—now known as the University of North Texas—during the 1977 NCAA Division I football season. In its fifth season under head coach Hayden Fry, the team compiled a 10–1 record. The team played its home games at Fouts Field in Denton, Texas.

Schedule

Roster

Rankings

Game summaries

Mississippi State

SMU

    
    
    
    
    
    

In the first meeting between the two teams at Texas Stadium, the Mean Green ended a 44-year drought against the Mustangs. Coach Hayden Fry earned a victory over the program that had controversially dismissed him in 1972.

Florida State

References

North Texas State
North Texas Mean Green football seasons
North Texas State Mean Green football